The Doyle Florist Inc.-H.R. Schenkel Inc. Greenhouse Range is a historic commercial garden property at 1339 Englewood Street in Lynchburg, Virginia. Developed beginning in 1920, it is a complex of nine greenhouses, five of which were built in 1920, with the other four added in later years beginning c. 1955. The complex is representative of the rise and fall of the cut flower industry in the nation, which reached its height in the 1950s and has since declined due to strong international competition. The facility was used for the production and distribution of cut flowers from 1920 to 1999.

The property was listed on the National Register of Historic Places in 2014.

See also
National Register of Historic Places listings in Lynchburg, Virginia

References

Commercial buildings on the National Register of Historic Places in Virginia
Commercial buildings completed in 1920
Buildings and structures in Lynchburg, Virginia
National Register of Historic Places in Lynchburg, Virginia